WXKQ-FM (103.9 FM, "The Bulldog") is a radio station licensed to serve Whitesburg, Kentucky. The station is owned by Forcht Broadcasting.  It airs an adult contemporary format.

The station has been assigned these call letters by the Federal Communications Commission since July 15, 1982.

References

External links
WXKQ-FM official website

XKQ
Whitesburg, Kentucky
Mainstream adult contemporary radio stations in the United States
1964 establishments in Kentucky